Earl of Dunmore is a title in the Peerage of Scotland.

History
The title was created in 1686 for Lord Charles Murray, second son of John Murray, 1st Marquess of Atholl. He was made Lord Murray of Blair, Moulin and Tillimet (or Tullimet) and Viscount of Fincastle at the same time, also in the Peerage of Scotland. He was succeeded by his son, the second Earl. He was a General in the Army and sat in the House of Lords as a Scottish Representative Peer from 1713 to 1715 and from 1727 to 1752. His younger brother, William Murray, later to become the third Earl, was involved in the Jacobite rising of 1745 and was tried for high treason in 1746. Murray pleaded guilty but received a pardon from King George II and succeeded to the peerages when his brother died unmarried six years later.

The third Earl was succeeded by his son. The fourth Earl was a Scottish Representative Peer in the House of Lords from 1761 to 1774 and from 1776 to 1790 and served as colonial governor of New York, Virginia and the Bahamas. His tenure as governor of the New York and Virginia colonies was to end with the start of the American Revolution. Lord Dunmore's eldest son, the fifth Earl, briefly represented Liskeard in the House of Commons. In 1831 he was created Baron Dunmore, of Dunmore in the Forest of Athole in the County of Perth, in the Peerage of the United Kingdom, which gave him and his descendants a permanent seat in the House of Lords.

George Murray, 5th Earl of Dunmore, bought the Estate of Harris from Alexander Norman Macleod for £60,000 in 1834. In 1839, the people of South Harris were ejected from their homes by armed soldiers and a posse of Glasgow policemen acting on orders from the government, at the behest of the Earl of Dunmore. The 6th Earl of Dunmore, Alexander Edward Murray, had inherited Harris upon the death of his father on 11 November 1836 and would in turn be succeeded by his son, Charles Adolphus, following the 6th Earl's death on 14 July 1845. Thus the 6th Earl was about halfway through his proprietorship of the island when he was providing a pound per person for those electing to leave.

The seventh Earl of Dunmore served as a Lord-in-waiting (government whip in the House of Lords) in the second Conservative administration of Benjamin Disraeli and was also Lord Lieutenant of Stirlingshire. The 7th Earl relinquished ownership of the North Harris Estate to his bankers, in particular the Scott family. He was succeeded by his son, the eighth Earl. He was a soldier and was awarded the Victoria Cross in 1897. Lord Dunmore later held political office as Captain of the Honourable Corps of Gentlemen-at-Arms (government chief whip in the House of Lords). On the death in 1980 of his grandson, the ninth Earl, the line of the fifth Earl failed and the barony of Dunmore became extinct.

The late Earl was succeeded by his distant relative (his fourth cousin once removed), the tenth Earl. He was the great-great-grandson of the Hon. Alexander Murray, second son of the fourth Earl, and lived in Tasmania, Australia.  the titles are held by his nephew, the twelfth Earl, who succeeded his father in 1995. He also lives in Tasmania, Australia and is a well respected Freemason.

As a male-line descendant of the first Marquess of Atholl he is also in remainder to this peerage and its subsidiary titles and by special remainder to the Dukedom, which are now held by his kinsman Bruce Murray, 12th Duke of Atholl.

The family seat was Amhuinnsuidhe Castle, on the Isle of Harris and Dunmore Tower, near Airth, Falkirk.

Earls of Dunmore (1686) 
 Charles Murray, 1st Earl of Dunmore (1661–1710)
 John Murray, 2nd Earl of Dunmore (1685–1752)
 William Murray, 3rd Earl of Dunmore (1696–1756)
 John Murray, 4th Earl of Dunmore (1730–1809)
 George Murray, 5th Earl of Dunmore (1762–1836)
 Alexander Edward Murray, 6th Earl of Dunmore (1804–1845)
 Charles Adolphus Murray, 7th Earl of Dunmore (1841–1907)
 Alexander Edward Murray, 8th Earl of Dunmore (1871–1962)
 John Alexander Murray, 9th Earl of Dunmore (1939–1980)
 Reginald Arthur Murray, 10th Earl of Dunmore (1911–1981)
 Kenneth Randolph Murray, 11th Earl of Dunmore (1913–1995)
 Malcolm Kenneth Murray, 12th Earl of Dunmore (b. 1946)

The heir presumptive is the present holder's brother Hon. Geoffrey Charles Murray (b. 1949).The heir presumptive's heir presumptive is his first cousin Stephen Alexander Murray (b. 1953).The heir presumptive's heir presumptive's heir apparent is his son, Anthony Victor Murray (b. 1989).

See also 

 Duke of Atholl
 Lady Augusta Murray
 Sir Charles Murray
 Baron Dunmore

References

Citations

Sources 

 Kidd, Charles, Williamson, David (editors). Debrett's Peerage and Baronetage (1990 edition). New York: St Martin's Press, 1990., 
 Donald J MacLeod, Woodcroft Avenue, Bridge of Don in The Scotsman, Edinburgh 21 April 2011
 The Caledonian Mercury, 2 September 1841

External links 
 
 
 

Earldoms in the Peerage of Scotland
Noble titles created in 1686
Clan Murray